The Shell Pennsylvania Petrochemicals Complex is an ethylene cracker plant located in Potter Township, Pennsylvania, United States, owned and operated by Shell Oil Company, the American subsidiary of supermajor oil company Royal Dutch Shell. Operations began in November, 2022  and will produce over a million tons per year of plastic pellets.

Site history
The location of the plant has had a long history as an industrial site. Both Horsehead Corporation and Koppers had plants on the site; Koppers unofficially incorporated the area as Kobuta. Before its industrial use, the area had been farmland owned by a local family, which included a private cemetery (albeit with unmarked graves) that was discovered after Shell purchased the property for cleanup; the company informed living descendants in the area of the skeletal remains.

Shell involvement
Pennsylvania, Ohio and West Virginia engaged in a tax competition for the plant. In 2012, Pennsylvania structured a deal requiring Shell to invest at least $1 billion in Pennsylvania and create at least 2,500 construction jobs in exchange for a 25-year tax incentive of $66 million per year and tied to production, reducing Shell's tax by up to 20 per cent. The combined incentive could reach $1.65 billion. Shell announced the Pennsylvania site on March 15, 2012. The deal was one of the largest tax incentives in Pennsylvania's history.

Shell began leasing the bulk of the property from Horsehead in 2012, which promptly closed the zinc plant on the site and began cleanup of the site in preparation of potentially opening a cracker plant on the site, which would be used to convert natural gas products into ethylene and then into plastics. Shell had selected the site due to the ongoing Marcellus natural gas trend and the site's prime location within the Marcellus Shale. By 2015, after executing several short-term lease extensions, Shell purchased the property outright from Horsehead, and subsequently purchasing other nearby properties, effectively absorbing all of Kobuta.

Shell pledged with Beaver County officials on environmental cleanup regardless if it opened the proposed plant, and in a worst-case scenario prepare the area land for at least some sort of future industrial use if Shell decided not to build there. This included building a massive bridge over PA 18, commenced in 2015, to connect both sides of the property without requiring an intersection along the route, as well as a Shell-funded rerouting of PA 18 and infrastructure improvements to I-376. Shell also gave a donation to the Beaver County recycling center so the center could extend its operating hours.

Despite a downturn in oil prices, on June 7, 2016, Shell announced it would build the plant. In a press release, Shell stated that 70% of polyethylene customers in North America are within a  radius of Pittsburgh and that the location would be more cost-effective for its customers than at existing facilities along the Gulf Coast, which unlike North Central Appalachia are susceptible to the Atlantic hurricane season.

Construction 

In 2015, Shell began preparing the site for future construction, moving 7.2 million cubic yards of dirt, building new bridges and a new rail line, and completing a total relocation of PA Route 18. Docking and bulkhead facilities to be used during construction were created by Alberici. Construction on the plant itself began on November 8, 2017, and is expected to continue through the early 2020s. As of 2019, over 5,000 employees are working on construction. The site will have four processing units – three of which will be polyethelene reactors and one an ethane cracker – a natural gas power plant to support both the plant and the local electric grid, a -long cooling tower, a rail system with over 3,000 freight cars, numerous loading facilities for both trains and trucks, a water treatment plant, an office building, a laboratory, and an innovation center once construction is complete.

On September 20, 2018, two of the world's largest cranes arrived on site.

On September 25, 2018 in a conference with the Wall Street Journal, Ben van Beurden, the CEO of Royal Dutch Shell, said that the project is both within budget and ahead of schedule.

The Pennsylvania Department of Environmental Protection approved two permits for a -long pipeline that will lead to the cracker plant on December 20, 2018. Called the Falcon Ethane Pipeline, it will connect ethane sources in Houston, Pennsylvania, Scio, Ohio, and Cadiz, Ohio to the plant. Construction on the pipeline began in March 2019.

Shell will also construct an 85,000-square-foot innovation center at the site of the plant, including labs, a "Center of Expertise", and an application hall. It is expected to be operational at the same time as the rest of the site.

Regional economic impact
The opening of the cracker plant could have an economic impact on both the immediate area and the Pittsburgh metropolitan area in general. In 2016, Shell estimated the project would create 6,000 construction jobs to build the site and 600 permanent jobs for employees working at the plant. It could expand neighboring Center Township, which has already seen a hotel construction boom prior to the plant's site selection, as well keep the dwindling Beaver Valley Mall afloat. The Penn-Beaver Hotel of Rochester, a building dating to the 1920s, once serving as a luxury hotel, was restored due to demand from plant construction. Parts of Northern Lights Shopping Center in Economy have been demolished for redevelopment, more than likely due to the plant. However, as of January 2020, Economy Borough has not been informed of any future redevelopment plans at the site.

The plant could become a factor spurring long-delayed highway expansion projects. The Southern Beltway, which had already confirmed would be extending its second leg in 2020 from U.S. Route 22 to Interstate 79, moved the project up a year solely as a result of the proposed plant.

Project opposition
In late 2015, a group of environmentalists submitted an appeal to Pennsylvania's Environmental Hearing Board to challenge the air quality permit that was granted for the proposed plant; the group argued that the state should have required stricter monitoring requirements for fugitive pollutant emissions from the plant.

The state of Pennsylvania will allow the factory to release 2.2 million tons of carbon dioxide each year. Shell has stated they believe the plant's emissions will be below that level.

Residents have also expressed concerns about the network of pipelines that will carry ethane to the plant, as existing pipelines have already caused problems. In September 2018, a landslide caused by heavy rains caused the Revolution pipeline, operated by Sunoco parent Energy Transfer Partners, to explode. One house was destroyed, other homes and vehicles were damaged, power lines were downed, and roads were closed; no one was injured.

In 2020, there were growing doubts and concerns about the realization of the plant as it will not be as profitable as expected, due to the fallen price for plastic, and contribute to global warming and plastic pollution on a large scale.

In popular culture 
Morgantown, West Virginia country-folk musician Charles Wesley Godwin wrote his song "Cranes of Potter" about the hypothetical backstory of the woman whose buried bones were found during excavation for the complex, which he saw driving from West Virginia to his studio in Pennsylvania.

References

Shell plc
Buildings and structures in Beaver County, Pennsylvania